Leta Lindley (born June 1, 1972) is an American professional golfer who captured her first LPGA Tour title after 15 years on tour at the 2008 LPGA Corning Classic.

Lindley, whose first golf job was painting stripes on range balls as an 11-year-old, has had a long and successful career in the game. After graduating from the University of Arizona in 1994 with a degree in communications, Lindley turned pro in 1995. She ranks among the top 60 all-time LPGA money winners, despite having only one win. Lindley's  husband, Matt Plagmann, caddies for her; her son Cole, and daughter Reese travel with the couple. The whole family was on the 18th green to celebrate her hard-earned victory at the 2008 Corning Classic after 295 LPGA Tour starts.

Professional wins (1)

LPGA Tour (1)

LPGA Tour playoff record (1–1)

External links

Adopt-A-Player profile on 2008 U.S. Women's Open official site

American female golfers
Arizona Wildcats women's golfers
LPGA Tour golfers
Golfers from Phoenix, Arizona
Golfers from Florida
People from Palm Beach Gardens, Florida
1972 births
Living people